The Upland–San Bernardino Line was an interurban line operated by the Pacific Electric Railway between Downtown Los Angeles and San Bernardino, California. This line also had shorter service that terminated before the end of the line at Baldwin Park, Covina, and San Dimas. Though service along this line in its entirety was discontinued in November 1941, it stands as the fourth-longest rapid transit line in American history, after the Sacramento Northern Chico and Colusa services, and the Pacific Electric's own Riverside–Rialto Line.

History
Pacific Electric trains reached Covina in 1907 and San Dimas on October 26, 1910 as the San Dimas Line. The route between Pomona and Upland was constructed by the Ontario and San Antonio Heights Railroad Company, which was acquired by Pacific Electric in 1912. Trains began running from the Pacific Electric Building to Pomona starting on August 31, 1912 as the Pomona Line. Finally on July 11, 1914 service to San Bernardino was commenced, providing interchanges with the San Bernardino Valley Traction Company. Pacific Electric spent $1,424,000 ($ in  adjusted for inflation) to bring service to San Bernardino. A cutoff bypassing Pomona was completed on November 4, 1914. A branch line to Azusa was built in 1917, though the commencement of San Bernardino trains relegated other endpoints to secondary status along the line. The San Dimas Line was relegated almost entirely to shuttle service between Lone Hill after July 11, 1914, though some through-service to Los Angeles remained until 1916.  Passenger trips to San Dimas was discontinued by July 3, 1924, though tracks were retained for farm freight.

In November 1920, two named trains were introduced on the line: the Citrus Belt Limited which traveled east in the afternoon and the Angel City Limited which made the reverse journey in the afternoon. Two more limited named trains were added in 1930: the Orange Empire Limited and Metropolitan Limited. (Pacific Electric only ran six named trains over its history, with five of them being on the San Bernardino Line.) All named trains were discontinued in 1931 along with other cuts made in response to decreased patronage due to the Great Depression.

Through service to Redlands was discontinued in 1936, while Pomona and San Bernardino trains began operating independently the following year (they had predominantly operated connected and split at Lordsburg this time). Most passenger service was truncated to Baldwin Park on November 1, 1941. Rush hour trains continued to serve Covina, and were even rerouted onto new tracks east of Baldwin Park obtained from the Southern Pacific in 1946. In 1947 all passenger trips were cut back to Baldwin Park. Unscheduled troop trains ran in World War II, though these trips were not open to civilians. On October 15, 1950, the Baldwin Park Line service was abandoned. Even after closure, the line remained popular with railfanning groups — the last passenger excursion under electric power on the line ran on August 25, 1951.

After abandonment

The western portion of the right of way was partially integrated into the San Bernardino Freeway. Metrolink San Bernardino Line trains utilize the same section in the freeway's median strip; this locomotive-hauled commuter rail service began in 1992. Between the cities of Claremont and Rialto, the line was converted to a rail trail: the Pacific Electric Trail.

Route
Originating from the 6th and Main Street station in Downtown Los Angeles, the San Bernardino Line exited to the east via an elevated structure over downtown streets to reach San Pedro Street at grade. The dual-tracks, running in the pavement of the city streets, proceeded north on San Pedro Street, east on Aliso Street (past its connection to Union Station) to cross the Los Angeles River and Mission Road on the Aliso Street Viaduct.

Directly east of Mission Road the tracks entered a private right of way which ran easterly and then northerly under the Brooklyn Avenue (Macy Street) Bridge. Paralleling Ramona Boulevard (since obliterated by construction of the I-10 Freeway), the line continued northerly, past the Macy Carhouse, to Enchandia Junction, where the South Pasadena Line branched north. From the junction, the tracks headed easterly, still paralleling Ramona Boulevard on the right, through the State Street Yard to Valley Junction, where the Pasadena Short Line and Monrovia–Glendora Lines also branched to the north. From Valley Junction (Soto Street and I-10 Freeway), the dual tracks on private way continued east along Ramona Boulevard, through City Terrace, Monterey Park, Alhambra, San Gabriel, and Rosemead to Baldwin Avenue in El Monte.

From that point, the line proceeded east on private way to cross the Rio Hondo on a single track steel girder bridge. The line then returned to dual tracks and continued east, still on private way paralleling Ramona Boulevard, crossing Valley Boulevard and Peck Road to reach the east city limits of El Monte at the San Gabriel River. Again, the line reduced to single track to cross the river on a long wood-pile bridge before returning to dual tracks on the east bank.

From the San Gabriel River, the line continued east, on private way paralleling Ramona Boulevard, to Badillo Street in Baldwin Park. Continuing, the double tracks ran along Badillo Street as far as Grand Avenue in Covina.

At Grand Avenue, the line became single track and ran on private way along the north side of Badillo Street as far as Banna Avenue in Covina. Here, the line turned in a northeasterly direction and ran on private way (intermittently paved by Ruddock Street, Badillo Street and Stratford Lane ). At Stratford Lane and Lone Hill Avenue (San Dimas Junction) the main line turned and proceeded east toward Pomona while a branch line continued on private way northeasterly into San Dimas on a single track. The main line continued on private way east from Lone Hill passing streets such as Cataract Avenue and Walnut Avenue and, turning gently southeast by Puddingstone Channel, proceeded parallel to Orange Street as far as E Street in Pomona. At E Street, a Pomona local branch line branched south and continued on private way. This diversion from the nearly continuous straight track to the east and west was the result of ranchers and farmers in Alta Vista donating right of way and funding to build the track further north.

The San Bernardino Line continued east, on single track on private way, paralleling the Santa Fe Railway north of Arrow Highway, and passing Towne Avenue and Indian Hill Boulevard in Claremont. Then turning northeasterly the line proceeded to Benson Avenue in Upland where it turned east again to run between Arrow Highway and 9th street. At 13th Avenue, a northeasterly course took the line to Alta Lorna, along private way, as far as Grande street and Archibald Avenue. Proceeding east from Alta Lorna in open country north of Base-line Road, the line passed Etiwanda Avenue and then turned southeasterly at East Etiwanda Creek into Fontana. It turned east again at Citrus Avenue in Fontana and proceeded north of Arrow Route Boulevard, paralleling it through Rialto toward San Bernardino. The line entered San Bernardino in the pavement of Rialto Avenue and proceeded east to a point between "E" and "F" Streets. Here, the San Bernardino Line turned north to follow a private way to its terminus at the joint Pacific Electric and Southern Pacific station on 3rd Street.

List of major stations

Infrastructure
The line operated a unique railway electrification system among Pacific Electric routes: overhead line was primarily electrified at 1200 volts direct current with 600 volt sections within town and city limits where the line shared tracks with local streetcars. Electrical substations providing high voltage power were located at Campbell Avenue, Baldwin Park, Baldy View, Etiwanda, and San Bernardino. Cars operated at both voltages.

Rolling stock
By 1924 the line was utilizing 1200 class rolling stock.

References

Bibliography

 
 

Pacific Electric routes
History of Los Angeles County, California
History of San Bernardino County, California
History of San Bernardino, California
San Gabriel Valley
Pomona Valley
Claremont, California
Covina, California
Upland, California
Railway services introduced in 1914
Railway services discontinued in 1941
1914 establishments in California
1941 disestablishments in California
1920s in California
1930s in California
Closed railway lines in the United States